Arf-GAP with Rho-GAP domain, ANK repeat and PH domain-containing protein 1 is a protein that in humans is encoded by the ARAP1 gene.

Function 

The protein encoded by this gene contains ARF-GAP, RHO-GAP, ankyrin repeat, RAS-associating, and pleckstrin homology domains. In vitro, this protein displays RHO-GAP and phosphatidylinositol (3,4,5) trisphosphate (PIP3)-dependent ARF-GAP activity. The encoded protein associates with the Golgi, and the ARF-GAP activity mediates changes in the Golgi and the formation of filopodia. The RHO-GAP activity may mediate cell rounding and loss of stress fibers. At least three transcript variants encoding different isoforms have been found for this gene, but the full-length natures of all variants have not been determined.

References

External links

Further reading